The 2009–10 season is Shrewsbury Town's 6th consecutive season in League Two.

Pre-season friendlies

Shropshire Senior Cup Final

League Two

FA Cup

Shrewsbury Town entered the 2009-10 FA Cup at the First Round.

League Cup
The draw for the First Round of the 2009-10 League Cup took place on 16 June 2009.  Shrewsbury Town was paired with Ipswich Town, the tie took place at New Meadow on 11 August 2009.

Johnston's Paint Trophy

A bye in the First Round of the 2009-10 Johnston's Paint Trophy was given to Shrewsbury Town.  In the Second Round, the club was paired with Accrington Stanley.  The game was originally scheduled to be played in the week commencing 5 October 2009, however a waterlogged pitch at the Crown Ground meant the game was postponed until 20 October 2009.

References 

Shrewsbury Town
Shrewsbury Town F.C. seasons